Hi-Teknology is the debut album from producer Hi-Tek, released on Rawkus Records. Most songs feature rapping or singing by other artists, and all are produced by Hi-Tek. A sequel, Hi-Teknology 2, was made for MCA Records but never released; a second Hi-Teknology 2 was recorded and released on Babygrande Records.

Track listing
"Scratch Rappin'"
"The Sun God" (Featuring Common & Vinia Mojica)
"Get Back Pt. II" (Featuring DCQ, Talib Kweli)
"Breakin' Bread" (Featuring Brian Digby Jr., Crunch, Donte, Main Flow)
"All I Need Is You" (Featuring Cormega & Jonell)
"Where I'm From" (Featuring Jinx Da Juvy)
"Tony Guitar Watson"
"Round & Round" (Featuring Jonell)
"Get Ta Steppin'" (Featuring Mos Def & Vinia Mojica)
"Theme From Hi-Tek" (Featuring Talib Kweli)
"L.T.A.H." (Featuring Slum Village)
"Suddenly" (Featuring - Donte, Main Flow)
"The Illest It Gets" (Featuring Buckshot)
"Hi-Teknology" (Featuring Jonell)

Samples
Breakin' Bread
"Rejected" by Elmer Bernstein
"Beats to the Rhyme" by Run-DMC
"Body Rock" by Mos Def, Q-Tip and Tash
All I Need Is You
"Hall of Mirrors" by Kraftwerk
Round & Round
"Burlesque in Barcelona" by Jakob Magnússon
Theme From Hi-Tek
"Mas Que Nada (Pow, Pow, Pow)" by Warren Kime
Suddenly
"Vole Vole Farandole" by Paul Mauriat

Album singles

Chart positions

Album chart positions

Singles chart positions

2001 debut albums
Hi-Tek albums
Rawkus Records albums
Albums produced by Hi-Tek